Kinyongia msuyae is a species of chameleons endemic to the Udzungwa Mountain region in Tanzania.

Etymology 
The species is named for Charles A. Msuya, a pioneering Tanzanian herpetologist who collected the first specimen attributable to the species.

References

Kinyongia
Reptiles described in 2015
Taxa named by Colin R. Tilbury
Taxa named by Krystal A. Tolley
Reptiles of Tanzania